Corpesca is an investigation and criminal case in Chile for payments made from the industrial fishing firm Corpesca to at least two politicians: Jaime Orpis (UDI) and Felipe Harboe (PPD). The payments were made to influence votes surrounding the fishing law, called the Longuiera Law, that in 2012 divided almost the entire fishing quota in Chile to companies controlled by not more than seven families. Further these fishing rights are passed to their heirs in perpetuity.

In Chile, a handful of industrial fishing companies hold the largest quotas for fishing for merluza, jurel, anchovies.  The Corpesca case is an investigation into payments made to influence the decisions made when the quotas were handed out under the Lonquiera law.

Corpesca is 77% controlled by Grupo Angelini.  The case is called Corpesca because that is the company accused of paying bribes.  These monies were directed to politicians by having persons present fake invoices to the tax authorities.  (In Chile companies create their invoices right on the web site of the tax service.) These fake invoices were presented by Carolina Zúñiga and family members, Alexis and Marcelo Ramírez Quiroz, two former policemen, Bárbara Molina Ellis, and Raúl Arrieta.

The Longuiera Law or Ley de Pesca (Fishing Law) granted quotas to 9 different industrial fishers and left small fisherman with a small percentage of the allowed harvest.  Small fishermen have called for this law to be modified in light of the apparent bribes to affect its outcome.  These small fishermen protest frequently against rules that, for example, require their boats to be equipped with GPS trackers to monitor that they are not going outside their allowed areas.

The case is being investigated by the same team of prosecutors who are investigating the SQM and Penta cases. The lead prosecutor is Sabas Chahuán.

Among the politicians accused of taking money from Corpesca is Jaine Orpis (UDI).  He is accused of taking $230 million CLP in bribes from Corpesca. There is a criminal complaint against Senator Orpis  for bribery.  He is accused of taking 230 million CLP in exchange for a favorable vote on the Ley Pesca (new fishing law that granted fishing quotas).

Charges have also been brought by Deputy Hugo Gutiérrez (PC) against Senator Antonio Horvath (ind.) for bribery.  He also brought charges against all the members of the Fishing Committee in the Senate who oversaw the passage of the Longuiera fishing law:  Fulvio Rossi, Carlos Bianchi, Alejandro García-Huidobro, and Hosaín Sabag.

References

Fishing in Chile
 
Corruption in Chile